Peter Edward Mackenzie Brown (born 28 July 1967) is a British Impressionist painter popularly known as "Pete the Street" from his practice of working on location in all weathers. He is best known for his depictions of street scenes and landscapes.  He loves working 'in the thick of it' painting the streets of Varanasi to Toronto and closer to home in Barcelona, Paris, London and his adopted home city of Bath.  He insists on working directly from the subject refusing to use photographic reference.

Life and career
Brown was born in Reading and educated at Presentation College, Reading. He graduated in fine art from Manchester Polytechnic in 1990. He moved to Bath in 1993, where he lives with his wife Lisa and five children, and took up painting full-time in 1995. He developed a vigorous en plein air style, and happily interacts with passers-by while at work. "Working is like being at a party. I need to be at the centre of things," he has said. "Consciously or subconsciously, what I experience finds its way onto the canvas."

Brown was elected a member of the New English Art Club in 1998, and became its President in 2018. He is also a member of the Royal Society of Portrait painters, The Royal Institute of Oil Painters, The Pastel Society and is an honorary member of the Royal Society of British Artists. In 2006 he became the first Artist in Residence at the Savoy Hotel, London. In 2008 he won the Prince of Wales Award for Portrait Drawing.

Notes and references

External links
Peter Brown website.
Peter Brown at Messum's.
Peter Brown page on the NEAC website.

1967 births
Living people
21st-century British painters
20th-century British painters
Artists from Reading, Berkshire
British male painters
20th-century British male artists
21st-century British male artists